Heretaunga may refer to:

Places
Heretaunga, Upper Hutt, a suburb of Upper Hutt, New Zealand 
Heretaunga (New Zealand electorate), a general electorate that existed from 1954 to 1996

 Hastings, New Zealand, which is called Heretaunga in Te Reo Māori
Heretaunga Street, arterial road through Hastings
Heretaunga Plains, alluvial plain at the southern end of Hawke's Bay
A division of Ngāti Kahungunu in the Hawke's Bay

Other uses
Heretaunga College, state coeducational secondary school in Upper Hutt
Heretaunga railway station, station on the Hutt Valley Line
Heretaunga Tamatea, a Māori iwi of New Zealand